Léon Jomaux (3 August 1922 – 15 March 1980) was a Belgian racing cyclist. He rode in the 1948 and 1949 Tour de France.

References

External links

1922 births
1980 deaths
Belgian male cyclists
Sportspeople from Charleroi
Cyclists from Hainaut (province)
20th-century Belgian people